The Aba Nigeria Temple is the 121st operating temple of the Church of Jesus Christ of Latter-day Saints (LDS Church).

History
The intent to construct the temple in Aba, in the state of Abia, to serve the nation's 68,000 Latter-day Saints was announced on April 2, 2000. This was the third temple to be built in Africa. A bridge had to be built over the river to provide access to the temple.

A groundbreaking ceremony and site dedication, with H. Bruce Stucky of the Seventy presiding, was held on February 23, 2002. More than 2,000 people were present at the ceremony including church leaders and members, tribal chiefs from the area, and government leaders. Construction began soon after the site dedication. An open house was held from June 18 to July 2, 2005, to allow people to tour the inside of the temple and learn about the ceremonies performed inside LDS temples.

The day before the temple was dedicated, a celebration was held, recounting the story of the area through song and dance. LDS Church president Gordon B. Hinckley dedicated the Aba Nigeria Temple the following day, on August 7, 2005. More than 7,000 people were present for the dedication.

The outer walls are made of Namibian pearl granite.

Closing and later years
The temple was closed in mid-June 2009 because of violence in the Aba area.  In an e-mail to the Ogden Standard-Examiner a Nigeria temple worker reported an incident in which four gunmen were seen carrying AK-47s, with shooting reported in the area around the temple. Bullets from the shooting struck the guardhouse on the temple grounds.

Additionally, the city of Aba and its Nigerian state of Abia had seen a marked increase in reported kidnappings, including the 2007 kidnapping of four missionaries near Port Harcourt.

When asked about the reason for closing of the temple, LDS Church spokesman Scott Trotter said, "The safety of our temple visitors and workers is always our first concern.  Incidents of violence in recent months in the area where the temple is situated are not necessarily related to the temple but could put church members at risk."

In 2010, Alexander A. Odume was called as president of the Aba Nigeria Temple, the first Nigerian to serve in this capacity. The temple opened largely on the basis of people scheduling ordinance work. By the latter part of 2011, the temple had resumed regular operations.

In 2013, John A. Ihenkoro, a native of Aba, but then living in Abuja and serving as the stake patriarch there, was called as the next temple president.

In 2020, along with all the church's other temples, the Aba Nigeria Temple was closed in response to the coronavirus pandemic.

See also

 Comparison of temples of The Church of Jesus Christ of Latter-day Saints
 List of temples of The Church of Jesus Christ of Latter-day Saints
 List of temples of The Church of Jesus Christ of Latter-day Saints by geographic region
 Temple architecture (Latter-day Saints)
 The Church of Jesus Christ of Latter-day Saints in Nigeria

References

External links
 
 Aba Nigeria Temple Official site
 Aba Nigeria Temple at ChurchofJesusChristTemples.org

Temples (LDS Church) completed in 2005
21st-century religious buildings and structures in Nigeria
Religious buildings and structures completed in 2005
Temples (LDS Church) in Africa
The Church of Jesus Christ of Latter-day Saints in Nigeria
2005 establishments in Nigeria
Buildings and structures in Aba, Abia